Eystein Weltzien (born 14 December 1949) is a Norwegian orienteering competitor.

He is Relay World Champion from 1978 as a member of the Norwegian winning team, as well as having bronze medal from 1974. He also obtained bronze in the 1974 Individual World Championships. He won the long distance Norwegian Championships in 1972, 1974 and 1975. He also had a position as trainer for the Norwegian national orienteering team in the 1980s. Weltzien was awarded Egebergs Ærespris in 1975, for excel in both orienteering and cross-country skiing.

His children Audun and Ingunn Hultgreen Weltzien compete in orienteering on an international level.

He has his education from the Norwegian School of Sport Sciences.

References

1949 births
Living people
Sportspeople from Bærum
Norwegian orienteers
Male orienteers
Foot orienteers
Ski-orienteers
World Orienteering Championships medalists
Norwegian School of Sport Sciences alumni
20th-century Norwegian people